Judy Blume Forever is a 2023 documentary film centered on American author Judy Blume, directed by Davina Pardo and Leah Wolchok. It premiered at the 2023 Sundance Film Festival, and will be released on Prime Video on April 21, 2023.

Summary
The documentary covers the life, career, and legacy of Judy Blume, including her experiences with some of her books being banned, and the current state of free speech in the United States. It documents her trajectory from her upbringing in New Jersey to suburban housewife to famous novelist of young adult fiction. It includes new interviews with Blume, as well as past talk show appearances, archival photographs, and testimonials about Blume's impact from actors Lena Dunham, Molly Ringwald, and Anna Konkle, comedian Samantha Bee, authors Mary H.K. Choi and Jacqueline Woodson, Blume's two children, and adult women who corresponded with Blume when they were teens.

Cast
 Judy Blume
 Lena Dunham
 Anna Konkle
 Molly Ringwald
 Samantha Bee
 Mary H.K. Choi
 Jacqueline Woodson

Production
While on a road trip with her husband and kids, Davina Pardo listened to an audiobook version of Judy Blume's young adult novel Tales of a Fourth Grade Nothing, and became curious about Blume's life. When directors Pardo and Leah Wolchok approached Blume in June 2018 about being the subject of a documentary, she was initially hesitant. In February 2020, she agreed, but filming was delayed due to the Covid-19 pandemic.

Release
The film premiered at the Sundance Film Festival on January 21, 2023. It will be released on Prime Video on April 21, 2023.

Reception
On Rotten Tomatoes, the film holds an approval rating of 91% based on 22 reviews. Kate Erbland of Indiewire gave the film a B+, writing that it provides "an edifying and rich overview of everything Judy." Guy Lodge of Variety called it "a lively, affectionate documentary tribute" in which "nostalgia for that sense of formative discovery is balanced by a present-tense exploration of Blume’s enduring popularity, resonance and controversy."  Tim Grierson of Screen Daily called Blume "fun company" who "comes across as a warm, generous spirit."

References

External links 
 

2023 films
2020s English-language films
2023 documentary films
American documentary films
Documentary films about women writers
Works by Judy Blume
Imagine Entertainment films
Amazon Studios films